Jack Gehrke (born January 14, 1946) is a former American football wide receiver. He played for the Kansas City Chiefs in 1968, the Cincinnati Bengals in 1969 and for the Denver Broncos in 1971.

References

1946 births
Living people
American football wide receivers
Utah Utes football players
Kansas City Chiefs players
Cincinnati Bengals players
Denver Broncos players
Players of American football from Salt Lake City